The German rural boarding school movement is a model of rural boarding school education designed to function more like a live-in community than traditional schooling models. The German pedagogue Hermann Lietz provided the philosophical underpinnings for the movement to create these schools in the early 20th century.

Background 

The pedagogue Hermann Lietz was raised in a rural setting, which he came to believe were the best environments for youth development.

Lietz schools 

Lietz opened his first rural boarding school in the mountainous Ilsenburg in 1898.

Lietz's followers would open additional schools beyond his four.

Lietz created a plan in 1911 to have his schools governed by a trust, but died in 1911 before the plan could be executed.

Influence 

Lietz's method influenced Kurt Hahn in the creation of the Schule Schloss Salem and his Outward Bound experiential learning program. The Germany rural boarding school movement also influenced the United World Colleges and similar schools internationally. Japanese education reformer Kuniyoshi Obara said he wanted "to be Lietz in Japan" and his Tamagawa Gakuen school took influence from the Lietz's model.

References

Bibliography

Further reading 

 

Education in Germany
Pedagogy
Education reform